Fredrik Lundberg (born 5 August 1951) is a Swedish businessman.
His father was Lars Erik Lundberg (1920-2001) founder of L E Lundbergföretagen. Fredrik Lundberg is president and CEO of L E Lundbergföretagen, of which he inherited a controlling stake from his father. He is the ninth wealthiest person in Sweden, and on number 529 of the richest people in the world according to Forbes magazine 2019.

Fredrik Lundberg enjoys hunting and was a one-time unofficial world junior champion of curling. He is also a supporter of IFK Norrköping and has financially supported their endeavours to return to Allsvenskan.

In June 2011 he received the award Chair of the Year 2011 Årets Ordförande for his work in Cardo AB from Styreinformasjon as in Oslo.

See also
List of billionaires
List of Swedes by net worth

References

External links
Lundbergs

1952 births
Living people
Fredrik
Stockholm School of Economics alumni
Swedish billionaires
Swedish businesspeople
Swedish male curlers